James Michael Volz (born 1964 or 1965) is an American politician of the Republican Party. He is a member of the Washington House of Representatives, representing the 6th Legislative District since 2017.

Early life, education, and career
Volz graduated from Ritzville High School and earned a bachelor's degree from Eastern Washington University. He later received an MBA from Gonzaga University.

Volz served as the assistant finance director for the Spokane Transit Authority before becoming the Deputy Treasurer for Spokane County. He also serves as an adjunct faculty member at Whitworth University.

Washington House of Representatives
Volz ran for the House seat following the announcement of the retirement of Representative Kevin Parker, along with two other Republicans. Volz defeated Democrat Lynnette Vehrs in the general election in 2016.

References

External links

1960s births
Year of birth uncertain
Living people
Republican Party members of the Washington House of Representatives
21st-century American politicians